Daegu International Airport (Revised Romanization: Daegu Gukje Gonghang; McCune-Reischauer: Taegu Kukche Konghang)  is the international airport serving the city of Daegu and the surrounding area in the southeast of South Korea. The airport is also a military base for the ROKAF's 11th Fighter Wing, whose three squadrons fly the F-15K.

Overview
The airport chiefly serves domestic routes with a small number of international flights. Despite the growth of the nearby city of Daegu, passenger numbers at Daegu International Airport have been steadily declining since 2004, the year when KTX highspeed rail reached the city. The 2013 number of about 1.1 million passengers is around half of pre-2003 figures.
Since in 2014, passenger numbers have increased sharply due to the expansion of Low-Cost Carriers. Because Daegu Airport is sharing with military, taking photograph or video of apron, runway and military facility is strictly prohibited.

History
Daegu International Airport was originally established under Japanese rule as Taegu Airfield on 31 January 1937.

Korean War
At the outbreak of the Korean War, the airfield consisted of a dirt and gravel runway and two concrete buildings. The airfield was designated by the USAF as K-2.

The airfield was used as part of the Bout One project, an emergency program to train Republic of Korea Air Force pilots to fly the F-51 Mustang. The Bout One planes provided close air support to the U.S. 24th Infantry Division through July 1950. On 10 July 1950, the Bout One force was re-designated as the 51st Fighter Squadron, and was merged into the 12th Fighter-Bomber Squadron on 4 August.

The existing dirt and gravel runway was improved by the 822nd Engineer Aviation Battalion beginning on 18 July, and the Battalion subsequently began preparations for a parallel  PSP runway on 7 August.

USAF units based at Taegu from July–August 1950 included:
18th Fighter-Bomber Group, from July–August 1950, subordinate units included:
12th Fighter-Bomber Squadron operating F-51 from 15 July 1950
51st Fighter Squadron (Provisional) from 10 July–August 4, 1950
6002nd Air Base Squadron from July–8 August 1950
6147th Tactical Control Squadron (Airborne) operating T-6 Mosquitos from 1 August–September 6, 1950
6149th Air Base Unit from August 1950

Taegu Airfield was abandoned following the North Korean attack on Taegu in mid-August 1950, but USAF units began reoccupying the base by 23 September 1950.

USAF units based at Taegu from September 1950 included:
49th Fighter-Bomber Group operating F-80s from 1 October 1950. This was the first jet unit to be based in Korea. Subordinate units included:
7th Fighter-Bomber Squadron from 28 September
8th Fighter-Bomber Squadron from 29 September
9th Fighter-Bomber Squadron from 29 September
543rd Tactical Support Group from 26 September, subordinate units included:
8th Tactical Reconnaissance Squadron, Photo-Jet operating RF-80s from 2 October
162nd Tactical Reconnaissance Squadron, Night Photo from 8 October
363rd Reconnaissance Technical Squadron from 4 October

In May 1951, the 930th Engineer Aviation Group began repair work on the PSP runway and commenced construction of a  concrete runway.

Postwar

Passenger facilities

The relatively small passenger terminal boasts a comfortable environment through its adoption of traditional design elements symbolizing Ouga (The song of five friend: water, rock, pine, bamboo, and moon; by Yun Seon Do), and its crane-like structure.
The parking lot can accommodate about 1,097 cars and has a fully automated parking system; it opens from 6 am to 10 pm.

Airlines and destinations

Statistics

Traffic by calendar year

Access
The airport is 1.34 km from Ayanggyo Station (Daegu Subway Line 1) and can be reached by bus or taxi.

See also
 Transportation in South Korea

References

External links
 Official Website

Buildings and structures in Daegu
Airports in South Korea
Korean War air bases
1937 establishments in Korea
20th-century architecture in South Korea